SM Town Live Culture Humanity (stylized as SMTOWN LIVE "Culture Humanity") was an online live concert held by SM Entertainment artists. The concert was held on January 1, 2021, and broadcast through Facebook, Twitter, V Live, YouTube, TikTok, Beyond Live and KNTV. The online live concert received 35.83 million viewers from 186 countries, becoming SM Town's most successful concert to date and the highest streamed concert in South Korean history.

Background and development 
On December 28, 2020, SM Entertainment announced that they would hold a free-of-charge online live concert. According to the music agency, the concert was designed to comfort and convey hope to people around the world who were having a hard time due to COVID-19 in the new year.

Commercial reception 
SM Entertainment's livestreamed global online live concert drew a record-breaking 35.83 million viewers on New Year's Day in video streaming platforms such as V Live, YouTube, Twitter, Facebook and TikTok.

Performers 

 Kangta
 TVXQ
 Super Junior (Super Junior-K.R.Y., Super Junior-D&E)
 Taeyeon (Girls' Generation)
 Taemin (Shinee)
 Baekhyun (Exo)
 Kai (Exo)
 Red Velvet
 NCT (NCT U, NCT 127, NCT Dream, WayV)
 SuperM
 Aespa
 ScreaM Records (Raiden, Ginjo, Imlay)

Set list 
This set list is intended to represent the show from the online live concert.
 "Ridin'" – NCT Dream
 "Take Off" – WayV
 "Punch" – NCT 127
 "Bad Boy" – Red Velvet
 "Peek-A-Boo" – Red Velvet
 "The Riot" – Ginjo ft. Ten and Xiaojun of NCT
 "Mmmh" – Kai
 "Reason" – Kai
 "Criminal" – Taemin
 "Idea" – Taemin
 "Growing Pains" – Super Junior-D&E
 "Asteroid" – Imlay ft. Yangyang of NCT
 "100" – SuperM
 "Better Days" – SuperM
 "UN Village" – Baekhyun ft. Mark of NCT
 "Candy" – Baekhyun
 "When We Were Us" – Super Junior-K.R.Y.
 "Cough Syrup" – Kangta
 "Four Seasons" – Taeyeon
 "Happy" – Taeyeon
 "What Do I Call You" – Taeyeon
 "Yours" – Raiden ft. Winter of Aespa
 "From Home" – NCT U
 "Make A Wish (Birthday Song)" – NCT U
 "Work It" – NCT U
 "90's Love" – NCT U
 "Super Clap" – Super Junior
 "2YA2YAO!" – Super Junior
 "The Chance of Love" – TVXQ
 "Dream" – TVXQ
 "Black Mamba" – Aespa
 "Déjà Vu" – NCT Dream
 "Turn Back Time" – WayV
 "Kick It" – NCT 127
 "Psycho" – Red Velvet
 "One (Monster & Infinity)" – SuperM
 "Burn The Floor" – Super Junior
 "Keep Your Head Down" – TVXQ
 "Hope" – SM Town
 ScreaM Stage – Raiden
 ScreaM Stage – Ginjo
 ScreaM Stage – Imlay

References 

SM Town concert tours
2021 concert tours
Beyond Live